Ludwigia anastomosans is a species of plant in the family Onagraceae. It is endemic to Brazil.

References

Endemic flora of Brazil
anastomosans
Vulnerable plants
Taxonomy articles created by Polbot